In nuclear physics, double beta decay is a type of radioactive decay in which two neutrons are simultaneously transformed into two protons, or vice versa, inside an atomic nucleus. As in single beta decay, this process allows the atom to move closer to the optimal ratio of protons and neutrons. As a result of this transformation, the nucleus emits two detectable beta particles, which are electrons or positrons.

The literature distinguishes between two types of double beta decay: ordinary double beta decay and neutrinoless double beta decay. In ordinary double beta decay, which has been observed in several isotopes, two electrons and two electron antineutrinos are emitted from the decaying nucleus. In neutrinoless double beta decay, a hypothesized process that has never been observed, only electrons would be emitted.

History

The idea of double beta decay was first proposed by Maria Goeppert Mayer in 1935.
In 1937, Ettore Majorana demonstrated that all results of beta decay theory remain unchanged if the neutrino were its own antiparticle, now known as a Majorana particle.
In 1939, Wendell H. Furry proposed that if neutrinos are Majorana particles, then double beta decay can proceed without the emission of any neutrinos, via the process now called neutrinoless double beta decay.
It is not yet known whether the neutrino is a Majorana particle, and, relatedly, whether neutrinoless double beta decay exists in nature.

In 1930–1940s, parity violation in weak interactions was not known, and consequently calculations showed that neutrinoless double beta decay should be much more likely to occur than ordinary double beta decay, if neutrinos were Majorana particles. The predicted half-lives were on the order of ~ years. Efforts to observe the process in laboratory date back to at least 1948 when E.L. Fireman made the first attempt to directly measure the half-life of the  isotope with a Geiger counter.
Radiometric experiments through about 1960 produced negative results or false positives, not confirmed by later experiments.
reasonably close to the modern value. This involved detecting the concentration in minerals of the xenon produced by the decay.

In 1956, after the  V − A  nature of weak interactions was established, it became clear that the half-life of neutrinoless double beta decay would significantly exceed that of ordinary double beta decay. Despite significant progress in experimental techniques in 1960–1970s, double beta decay was not observed in a laboratory until the 1980s. Experiments had only been able to establish the lower bound for the half-life – about  years.

Since then, many experiments have observed ordinary double beta decay in other isotopes. None of those experiments have produced positive results for the neutrinoless process, raising the half-life lower bound to approximately  years. Geochemical experiments continued through the 1990s, producing positive results for several  isotopes. Double beta decay is the rarest known kind of radioactive decay; as of 2019 it has been observed in only 14 isotopes (including double electron capture in  observed in 2001,  observed in 2013, and  observed in 2019), and all have a mean lifetime over  yr (table below).

Ordinary double beta decay
In a typical double beta decay, two neutrons in the nucleus are converted to protons, and two electrons and two electron antineutrinos are emitted. The process can be thought as two simultaneous beta minus decays. In order for (double) beta decay to be possible, the final nucleus must have a larger binding energy than the original nucleus. For some nuclei, such as germanium-76, the isobar one atomic number higher (arsenic-76) has a smaller binding energy, preventing single beta decay. However, the isobar with atomic number two higher, selenium-76, has a larger binding energy, so double beta decay is allowed.

The emission spectrum of the two electrons can be computed in a similar way to beta emission spectrum using Fermi's golden rule. The differential rate is given by

For some nuclei, the process occurs as conversion of two protons to neutrons, emitting two electron neutrinos and absorbing two orbital electrons (double electron capture). If the mass difference between the parent and daughter atoms is more than 1.022 MeV/c2 (two electron masses), another decay is accessible, capture of one orbital electron and emission of one positron. When the mass difference is more than 2.044 MeV/c2 (four electron masses), emission of two positrons is possible. These theoretical decay branches have not been observed.

Known double beta decay isotopes
There are 35 naturally occurring isotopes capable of double beta decay. In practice, the decay can be observed when the single beta decay is forbidden by energy conservation. This happens for elements with an even atomic number and even neutron number, which are more stable due to spin-coupling. When single beta decay or alpha decay also occur, the double beta decay rate is generally too low to observe.

Fourteen isotopes have been experimentally observed undergoing two-neutrino double beta decay (β–β–) or double electron capture (εε). The table below contains nuclides with the latest experimentally measured half-lives, as of December 2016, except for 124Xe (for which double electron capture was first observed in 2019). Where two uncertainties are specified, the first one is statistical uncertainty and the second is systematic.

Searches for double beta decay in isotopes that present significantly greater experimental challenges are ongoing.

The following known beta-stable (or almost beta-stable) nuclides with A ≤ 260 are theoretically capable of double beta decay, where red are isotopes that have a double-beta rate measured experimentally and black have yet to be measured experimentally: 46Ca, 70Zn, 80Se, 86Kr, 94Zr, 98Mo, 104Ru, 110Pd, 114Cd, 122Sn, 124Sn, 134Xe, 142Ce, 146Nd, 148Nd, 154Sm, 160Gd, 170Er, 176Yb, 186W, 192Os, 198Pt, 204Hg, 216Po, 220Rn, 222Rn, 226Ra, 232Th, 244Pu, 248Cm, 254Cf, 256Cf, and 260Fm.

The following known beta-stable (or almost beta-stable) nuclides with A ≤ 260 are theoretically capable of double electron capture, where red are isotopes that have a double-electron capture rate measured and black have yet to be measured experimentally: 36Ar, 40Ca, 50Cr, 54Fe, 58Ni, 64Zn, 74Se, 84Sr, 92Mo, 96Ru, 102Pd, 106Cd, 108Cd, 112Sn, 120Te, 126Xe, 132Ba, 136Ce, 138Ce, 144Sm, 148Gd, 150Gd, 152Gd, 154Dy, 156Dy, 158Dy, 162Er, 164Er, 168Yb, 174Hf, 180W, 184Os, 190Pt, 196Hg, 212Rn, 214Rn, 218Ra, 224Th, 230U, 236Pu, 242Cm, 252Fm, and 258No.

Neutrinoless double beta decay

If the neutrino is a Majorana particle (i.e., the antineutrino and the neutrino are actually the same particle), and at least one type of neutrino has non-zero mass (which has been established by the neutrino oscillation experiments), then it is possible for neutrinoless double beta decay to occur. Neutrinoless double beta decay is a lepton number violating process. In the simplest theoretical treatment, known as light neutrino exchange, a nucleon absorbs the neutrino emitted by another nucleon. The exchanged neutrinos are virtual particles.

With only two electrons in the final state, the electrons' total kinetic energy would be approximately the binding energy difference of the initial and final nuclei, with the nuclear recoil accounting for the rest. Because of momentum conservation, electrons are generally emitted back-to-back. The decay rate for this process is given by

where G is the two-body phase-space factor, M is the nuclear matrix element, and mββ is the effective Majorana mass of the electron neutrino. In the context of light Majorana neutrino exchange, mββ is given by

where mi are the neutrino masses and the Uei are elements of the Pontecorvo–Maki–Nakagawa–Sakata (PMNS) matrix. Therefore, observing neutrinoless double beta decay, in addition to confirming the Majorana neutrino nature, can give information on the absolute neutrino mass scale and Majorana phases in the PMNS matrix, subject to interpretation through theoretical models of the nucleus, which determine the nuclear matrix elements, and models of the decay.

The observation of neutrinoless double beta decay would require that at least one neutrino is a Majorana particle, irrespective of whether the process is engendered by neutrino exchange.

Experiments
Numerous experiments have searched for neutrinoless double beta decay. The best-performing experiments have a high mass of the decaying isotope and low backgrounds, with some experiments able to perform particle discrimination and electron tracking. In order to remove backgrounds from cosmic rays, most experiments are located in underground laboratories around the world.

Recent and proposed experiments include:
 Completed experiments:
 Gotthard TPC
 Heidelberg-Moscow, 76Ge detectors (1997–2001)
 IGEX, 76Ge detectors (1999–2002)
 NEMO, various isotopes using tracking calorimeters (2003–2011)
 Cuoricino, 130Te in ultracold TeO2 crystals (2003–2008)
 Experiments taking data as of November 2017:
 COBRA, 116Cd in room temperature CdZnTe crystals
 CUORE, 130Te in ultracold TeO2 crystals
 EXO, a 136Xe and 134Xe search
 GERDA, a 76Ge detector
 KamLAND-Zen, a 136Xe search. Data collection from 2011.
 , using high purity 76Ge p-type point-contact detectors.
 XMASS using liquid Xe
 Proposed/future experiments:
 CUPID, neutrinoless double-beta decay of 100Mo
 CANDLES, 48Ca in CaF2, at Kamioka Observatory
 MOON, developing 100Mo detectors
 AMoRE, 100Mo enriched CaMoO4 crystals at YangYang underground laboratory
 nEXO, using liquid 136Xe in a time projection chamber  
 LEGEND, Neutrinoless Double-beta Decay of 76Ge.
 LUMINEU, exploring 100Mo enriched ZnMoO4 crystals at LSM, France.
 NEXT, a Xenon TPC. NEXT-DEMO ran and NEXT-100 will run in 2016.
 SNO+, a liquid scintillator, will study 130Te
 SuperNEMO, a NEMO upgrade, will study 82Se
 TIN.TIN, a 124Sn detector at INO
 PandaX-III, an experiment with 200 kg to 1000 kg of 90% enriched 136Xe
 DUNE, a TPC filled with liquid Argon doped with 136Xe.

Status 
While some experiments have claimed a discovery of neutrinoless double beta decay, modern searches have found no evidence for the decay.

Heidelberg-Moscow Controversy
Some members of the Heidelberg-Moscow collaboration claimed a detection of neutrinoless beta decay in 76Ge in 2001. This claim was criticized by outside physicists as well as other members of the collaboration. In 2006, a refined estimate by the same authors stated the half-life was 2.3 years. This half-life has been excluded at high confidence by other experiments, including in 76Ge by GERDA.

Current results
As of 2017, the strongest limits on neutrinoless double beta decay have come from GERDA in 76Ge, CUORE in 130Te, and EXO-200 and KamLAND-Zen in 136Xe.

Higher order simultaneous beta decay
For mass numbers with more than two beta-stable isobars, quadruple beta decay and its inverse, quadruple electron capture, have been proposed as alternatives to double beta decay in the isobars with the greatest energy excess. These decays are energetically possible in eight nuclei, though partial half-lives compared to single or double beta decay are predicted to be very long; hence, quadruple beta decay is unlikely to be observed. The eight candidate nuclei for quadruple beta decay include 96Zr, 136Xe, and 150Nd capable of quadruple beta-minus decay, and 124Xe, 130Ba, 148Gd, and 154Dy capable of quadruple beta-plus decay or electron capture. In theory, quadruple beta decay may be experimentally observable in three of these nuclei, with the most promising candidate being 150Nd. Triple beta decay is also possible for 48Ca, 96Zr, and 150Nd.

Moreover, such a decay mode could also be neutrinoless in physics beyond the standard model. Neutrinoless quadruple beta decay would violate lepton number in 4 units, as opposed to a lepton number breaking of two units in the case of neutrinoless double beta decay. Therefore, there is no 'black-box theorem' and neutrinos could be Dirac particles while allowing these type of processes. In particular, if neutrinoless quadruple beta decay is found before neutrinoless double beta decay then the expectation is that neutrinos will be Dirac particles.

So far, searches for triple and quadruple beta decay in 150Nd have remained unsuccessful.

See also
 Double electron capture
 Beta decay
 Neutrino
 Particle radiation
 Radioactive isotope

References

External links
 Double beta decay on arxiv.org

Nuclear physics
Radioactivity
Neutrinos